Camptopoeum friesei is a species of bees of the genus Camptopoeum.

Description 
The species is 6-10 mm in size, the hairs of the male are long and dense, those of the female short and tight.

Range 
Central Asian-Eastern European. From Spain, southern and eastern Europe, Ukraine and southern Russia to Bashkiria and across Asia Minor and the Caucasus to western Turkmenistan and western Kazakhstan; northward to Eastern Austria and Slovakia, south to Lazio, Crete and the south coast of Turkey. In central Europe exclusively in the Lacken area of the Seewinkel area (Burgenland, Austria).

Habitat 
Camptopoeum friesei occurs in salt steppes from the lowlands to the colline altitude level.

Ecology 
Flight period is in one generation from July to September. Camptopoeum friesei is oligolectic on Asteraceae of the subfamily Carduoideae, mainly Centaurea and Carduus. When it comes to the nesting substrate, Camptopoeum friesei is extremely specialized. It only nests in salty, alternately moist soda soils (Solontschak soils), which e.g. occur in the area around Lake Neusiedl. It usually forms nest aggregations. Camptopoeum friesei is being parasited by the cuckoo bee Parammobatodes schmidti.

Etymology 
Dedicated to the German apidologist Heinrich FRIESE (1860-1948).

References 

Andrenidae